Koparit (originally Kuopion Pallotoverit, or KPT for short) was a football club from Kuopio, Finland. It was founded in 1931 and disbanded in 1990. The club played a total of 21 seasons in the Finnish premier division Mestaruussarja between 1938 and 1987, reaching the runners-up position twice, in the 1978 and 1981 seasons. It participated in the UEFA Cup in the 1979–80 and 1982–83 seasons but were knocked out in the first round on both attempts.

History
KPT was formed 1931 after internal disputes in KuPS. They grew rapidly and was one of countries leading youth clubs during its early years. Their strong work with youngsters led club to be promoted to premier league as a first inland club in 1937. In 1980s club was driven in to financial difficulties which eventually led to disbanding of the club in early 1990s.

Season to season

{|  class="wikitable"
|- style="background:#f0f6fa;"
!Season
!Level
!Division
!Section
!Administration
!Position
!Movements
|- 
|style="background:#77DD77;"|1932
|style="background:#77DD77;"|Tier 3
|style="background:#77DD77;"|Piirinsarja (District League)
|style="background:#77DD77;"|
|style="background:#77DD77;"|Savo District (SPL Savo)
|style="background:#77DD77;"|5th
|style="background:#77DD77;"|
|- 
|style="background:#77DD77;"|1933
|style="background:#77DD77;"|Tier 3
|style="background:#77DD77;"|Piirinsarja (District League)
|style="background:#77DD77;"|
|style="background:#77DD77;"|Savo District (SPL Savo)
|style="background:#77DD77;"|6th
|style="background:#77DD77;"|
|-
|style="background:#87CEFA;"|1934
|style="background:#87CEFA;"|Tier 2
|style="background:#87CEFA;"|B-sarja (First Division)
|style="background:#87CEFA;"|East Group
|style="background:#87CEFA;"|Finnish FA (Suomen Palloliitto)
|style="background:#87CEFA;"|4th
|style="background:#87CEFA;"|
|-
|style="background:#87CEFA;"|1935
|style="background:#87CEFA;"|Tier 2
|style="background:#87CEFA;"|B-sarja (First Division)
|style="background:#87CEFA;"|East Group
|style="background:#87CEFA;"|Finnish FA (Suomen Palloliitto)
|style="background:#87CEFA;"|3rd
|style="background:#87CEFA;"|
|-
|style="background:#87CEFA;"|1936
|style="background:#87CEFA;"|Tier 2
|style="background:#87CEFA;"|Itä-Länsi-sarja (First Division)
|style="background:#87CEFA;"|East Group
|style="background:#87CEFA;"|Finnish FA (Suomen Palloliitto)
|style="background:#87CEFA;"|1st
|style="background:#87CEFA;"|Promotion Group 3rd
|-
|style="background:#87CEFA;"|1937
|style="background:#87CEFA;"|Tier 2
|style="background:#87CEFA;"|Itä-Länsi-sarja (First Division)
|style="background:#87CEFA;"|East Group
|style="background:#87CEFA;"|Finnish FA (Suomen Palloliitto)
|style="background:#87CEFA;"|1st
|style="background:#87CEFA;"|Promotion Playoff - Promoted
|-
|style="background:#FFFF00;"|1938
|style="background:#FFFF00;"|Tier 1
|style="background:#FFFF00;"|Mestaruussarja (Premier League)
|style="background:#FFFF00;"|
|style="background:#FFFF00;"|Finnish FA (Suomen Palloliitto)
|style="background:#FFFF00;"|7th
|style="background:#FFFF00;"|Relegation Playoff
|-
|style="background:#FFFF00;"|1939
|style="background:#FFFF00;"|Tier 1
|style="background:#FFFF00;"|Mestaruussarja (Premier League)
|style="background:#FFFF00;"|
|style="background:#FFFF00;"|Finnish FA (Suomen Palloliitto)
|style="background:#FFFF00;"|7th
|style="background:#FFFF00;"|Relegated
|-            
|style="background:#87CEFA;"|1940–41
|style="background:#87CEFA;"|Tier 2
|style="background:#87CEFA;"|B-sarja (First Division)
|style="background:#87CEFA;"|
|style="background:#87CEFA;"|Finnish FA (Suomen Palloliitto)
|style="background:#87CEFA;"|2nd
|style="background:#87CEFA;"|Promoted
|-
|style="background:#FFFF00;"|1943-44
|style="background:#FFFF00;"|Tier 1
|style="background:#FFFF00;"|Mestaruussarja (Premier League)
|style="background:#FFFF00;"|
|style="background:#FFFF00;"|Finnish FA (Suomen Palloliitto)
|style="background:#FFFF00;"|8th
|style="background:#FFFF00;"|
|-
|style="background:#FFFF00;"|1945
|style="background:#FFFF00;"|Tier 1
|style="background:#FFFF00;"|Mestaruussarja (Premier League)
|style="background:#FFFF00;"|Group B
|style="background:#FFFF00;"|Finnish FA (Suomen Palloliitto)
|style="background:#FFFF00;"|2nd
|style="background:#FFFF00;"|
|-
|style="background:#FFFF00;"|1945-46
|style="background:#FFFF00;"|Tier 1
|style="background:#FFFF00;"|Mestaruussarja (Premier League)
|style="background:#FFFF00;"|
|style="background:#FFFF00;"|Finnish FA (Suomen Palloliitto)
|style="background:#FFFF00;"|7th
|style="background:#FFFF00;"|Relegated
|-            
|style="background:#87CEFA;"|1946-47
|style="background:#87CEFA;"|Tier 2
|style="background:#87CEFA;"|Suomensarja (First Division)
|style="background:#87CEFA;"|North Group
|style="background:#87CEFA;"|Finnish FA (Suomen Palloliitto)
|style="background:#87CEFA;"|3rd
|style="background:#87CEFA;"|
|-            
|style="background:#87CEFA;"|1947-48
|style="background:#87CEFA;"|Tier 2
|style="background:#87CEFA;"|Suomensarja (First Division)
|style="background:#87CEFA;"|North Group
|style="background:#87CEFA;"|Finnish FA (Suomen Palloliitto)
|style="background:#87CEFA;"|6th
|style="background:#87CEFA;"|
|-            
|style="background:#87CEFA;"|1948
|style="background:#87CEFA;"|Tier 2
|style="background:#87CEFA;"|Suomensarja (First Division)
|style="background:#87CEFA;"|North Group
|style="background:#87CEFA;"|Finnish FA (Suomen Palloliitto)
|style="background:#87CEFA;"|5th
|style="background:#87CEFA;"|
|-            
|style="background:#87CEFA;"|1949
|style="background:#87CEFA;"|Tier 2
|style="background:#87CEFA;"|Suomensarja (First Division)
|style="background:#87CEFA;"|East Group
|style="background:#87CEFA;"|Finnish FA (Suomen Palloliitto)
|style="background:#87CEFA;"|6th
|style="background:#87CEFA;"|
|-            
|style="background:#87CEFA;"|1950
|style="background:#87CEFA;"|Tier 2
|style="background:#87CEFA;"|Suomensarja (First Division)
|style="background:#87CEFA;"|East Group
|style="background:#87CEFA;"|Finnish FA (Suomen Palloliitto)
|style="background:#87CEFA;"|4th
|style="background:#87CEFA;"|
|-            
|style="background:#87CEFA;"|1951
|style="background:#87CEFA;"|Tier 2
|style="background:#87CEFA;"|Suomensarja (First Division)
|style="background:#87CEFA;"|East Group
|style="background:#87CEFA;"|Finnish FA (Suomen Palloliitto)
|style="background:#87CEFA;"|6th
|style="background:#87CEFA;"|
|-            
|style="background:#87CEFA;"|1952
|style="background:#87CEFA;"|Tier 2
|style="background:#87CEFA;"|Suomensarja (First Division)
|style="background:#87CEFA;"|East Group
|style="background:#87CEFA;"|Finnish FA (Suomen Palloliitto)
|style="background:#87CEFA;"|3rd
|style="background:#87CEFA;"|
|-            
|style="background:#87CEFA;"|1953
|style="background:#87CEFA;"|Tier 2
|style="background:#87CEFA;"|Suomensarja (First Division)
|style="background:#87CEFA;"|East Group
|style="background:#87CEFA;"|Finnish FA (Suomen Palloliitto)
|style="background:#87CEFA;"|1st
|style="background:#87CEFA;"|Promoted
|-
|style="background:#FFFF00;"|1954
|style="background:#FFFF00;"|Tier 1
|style="background:#FFFF00;"|Mestaruussarja (Premier League)
|style="background:#FFFF00;"|
|style="background:#FFFF00;"|Finnish FA (Suomen Palloliitto)
|style="background:#FFFF00;"|10th
|style="background:#FFFF00;"|Relegated
|-            
|style="background:#87CEFA;"|1955
|style="background:#87CEFA;"|Tier 2
|style="background:#87CEFA;"|Suomensarja (First Division)
|style="background:#87CEFA;"|East Group
|style="background:#87CEFA;"|Finnish FA (Suomen Palloliitto)
|style="background:#87CEFA;"|3rd
|style="background:#87CEFA;"|
|-            
|style="background:#87CEFA;"|1956
|style="background:#87CEFA;"|Tier 2
|style="background:#87CEFA;"|Suomensarja (First Division)
|style="background:#87CEFA;"|East Group
|style="background:#87CEFA;"|Finnish FA (Suomen Palloliitto)
|style="background:#87CEFA;"|5th
|style="background:#87CEFA;"|
|-            
|style="background:#87CEFA;"|1957
|style="background:#87CEFA;"|Tier 2
|style="background:#87CEFA;"|Suomensarja (First Division)
|style="background:#87CEFA;"|East Group
|style="background:#87CEFA;"|Finnish FA (Suomen Palloliitto)
|style="background:#87CEFA;"|3rd
|style="background:#87CEFA;"|
|-            
|style="background:#87CEFA;"|1958
|style="background:#87CEFA;"|Tier 2
|style="background:#87CEFA;"|Suomensarja (First Division)
|style="background:#87CEFA;"|North Group
|style="background:#87CEFA;"|Finnish FA (Suomen Palloliitto)
|style="background:#87CEFA;"|2nd
|style="background:#87CEFA;"|
|-            
|style="background:#87CEFA;"|1959
|style="background:#87CEFA;"|Tier 2
|style="background:#87CEFA;"|Suomensarja (First Division)
|style="background:#87CEFA;"|North Group
|style="background:#87CEFA;"|Finnish FA (Suomen Palloliitto)
|style="background:#87CEFA;"|2nd
|style="background:#87CEFA;"|
|-            
|style="background:#87CEFA;"|1960
|style="background:#87CEFA;"|Tier 2
|style="background:#87CEFA;"|Suomensarja (First Division)
|style="background:#87CEFA;"|East Group
|style="background:#87CEFA;"|Finnish FA (Suomen Palloliitto)
|style="background:#87CEFA;"|5th
|style="background:#87CEFA;"|
|-            
|style="background:#87CEFA;"|1961
|style="background:#87CEFA;"|Tier 2
|style="background:#87CEFA;"|Suomensarja (First Division)
|style="background:#87CEFA;"|North Group
|style="background:#87CEFA;"|Finnish FA (Suomen Palloliitto)
|style="background:#87CEFA;"|2nd
|style="background:#87CEFA;"|Promotion Playoff
|-            
|style="background:#87CEFA;"|1962
|style="background:#87CEFA;"|Tier 2
|style="background:#87CEFA;"|Suomensarja (First Division)
|style="background:#87CEFA;"|North Group
|style="background:#87CEFA;"|Finnish FA (Suomen Palloliitto)
|style="background:#87CEFA;"|5th
|style="background:#87CEFA;"|
|-            
|style="background:#87CEFA;"|1963
|style="background:#87CEFA;"|Tier 2
|style="background:#87CEFA;"|Suomensarja (First Division)
|style="background:#87CEFA;"|North Group
|style="background:#87CEFA;"|Finnish FA (Suomen Palloliitto)
|style="background:#87CEFA;"|12th
|style="background:#87CEFA;"|Relegated
|- 
|style="background:#77DD77;"|1964
|style="background:#77DD77;"|Tier 3
|style="background:#77DD77;"|Maakuntasarja (Second Division)
|style="background:#77DD77;"|Group 7
|style="background:#77DD77;"|Finnish FA (Suomen Palloliitto)
|style="background:#77DD77;"|4th
|style="background:#77DD77;"|
|- 
|style="background:#77DD77;"|1965
|style="background:#77DD77;"|Tier 3
|style="background:#77DD77;"|Maakuntasarja (Second Division)
|style="background:#77DD77;"|Group 7
|style="background:#77DD77;"|Finnish FA (Suomen Palloliitto)
|style="background:#77DD77;"|7th
|style="background:#77DD77;"|Relegated
|- 
|style="background:#FF7F00;"|1966
|style="background:#FF7F00;"|Tier 4
|style="background:#FF7F00;"|Aluesarja (Third Division)
|style="background:#FF7F00;"|Group 13
|style="background:#FF7F00;"|Savo (SPL Savo)
|style="background:#FF7F00;"|1st
|style="background:#FF7F00;"|Promoted
|- 
|style="background:#77DD77;"|1967
|style="background:#77DD77;"|Tier 3
|style="background:#77DD77;"|Maakuntasarja (Second Division)
|style="background:#77DD77;"|Group 8
|style="background:#77DD77;"|Finnish FA (Suomen Palloliitto)
|style="background:#77DD77;"|5th
|style="background:#77DD77;"|
|- 
|style="background:#77DD77;"|1968
|style="background:#77DD77;"|Tier 3
|style="background:#77DD77;"|Maakuntasarja (Second Division)
|style="background:#77DD77;"|Group 6
|style="background:#77DD77;"|Finnish FA (Suomen Palloliitto)
|style="background:#77DD77;"|1st
|style="background:#77DD77;"|Promoted
|-            
|style="background:#87CEFA;"|1969
|style="background:#87CEFA;"|Tier 2
|style="background:#87CEFA;"|Suomensarja (First Division)
|style="background:#87CEFA;"|North Group
|style="background:#87CEFA;"|Finnish FA (Suomen Palloliitto)
|style="background:#87CEFA;"|8th
|style="background:#87CEFA;"|
|-            
|style="background:#87CEFA;"|1970
|style="background:#87CEFA;"|Tier 2
|style="background:#87CEFA;"|II Divisioona (First Division)
|style="background:#87CEFA;"|North Group
|style="background:#87CEFA;"|Finnish FA (Suomen Palloliitto)
|style="background:#87CEFA;"|9th
|style="background:#87CEFA;"|
|-            
|style="background:#87CEFA;"|1971
|style="background:#87CEFA;"|Tier 2
|style="background:#87CEFA;"|II Divisioona (First Division)
|style="background:#87CEFA;"|North Group
|style="background:#87CEFA;"|Finnish FA (Suomen Palloliitto)
|style="background:#87CEFA;"|1st
|style="background:#87CEFA;"|Promotion Group 1st - Promoted
|-
|style="background:#FFFF00;"|1972
|style="background:#FFFF00;"|Tier 1
|style="background:#FFFF00;"|Mestaruussarja (Premier League)
|style="background:#FFFF00;"|
|style="background:#FFFF00;"|Finnish FA (Suomen Palloliitto)
|style="background:#FFFF00;"|7th
|style="background:#FFFF00;"|
|-
|style="background:#FFFF00;"|1973
|style="background:#FFFF00;"|Tier 1
|style="background:#FFFF00;"|Mestaruussarja (Premier League)
|style="background:#FFFF00;"|
|style="background:#FFFF00;"|Finnish FA (Suomen Palloliitto)
|style="background:#FFFF00;"|6th
|style="background:#FFFF00;"|
|-
|style="background:#FFFF00;"|1974
|style="background:#FFFF00;"|Tier 1
|style="background:#FFFF00;"|Mestaruussarja (Premier League)
|style="background:#FFFF00;"|
|style="background:#FFFF00;"|Finnish FA (Suomen Palloliitto)
|style="background:#FFFF00;"|5th
|style="background:#FFFF00;"|
|-
|style="background:#FFFF00;"|1975
|style="background:#FFFF00;"|Tier 1
|style="background:#FFFF00;"|Mestaruussarja (Premier League)
|style="background:#FFFF00;"|
|style="background:#FFFF00;"|Finnish FA (Suomen Palloliitto)
|style="background:#FFFF00;"|5th
|style="background:#FFFF00;"|
|-
|style="background:#FFFF00;"|1976
|style="background:#FFFF00;"|Tier 1
|style="background:#FFFF00;"|Mestaruussarja (Premier League)
|style="background:#FFFF00;"|
|style="background:#FFFF00;"|Finnish FA (Suomen Palloliitto)
|style="background:#FFFF00;"|12th
|style="background:#FFFF00;"|Relegated
|-            
|style="background:#87CEFA;"|1977
|style="background:#87CEFA;"|Tier 2
|style="background:#87CEFA;"|I Divisioona (First Division)
|style="background:#87CEFA;"|
|style="background:#87CEFA;"|Finnish FA (Suomen Palloliitto)
|style="background:#87CEFA;"|1st
|style="background:#87CEFA;"|Promoted
|-
|style="background:#FFFF00;"|1978
|style="background:#FFFF00;"|Tier 1
|style="background:#FFFF00;"|Mestaruussarja (Premier League)
|style="background:#FFFF00;"|
|style="background:#FFFF00;"|Finnish FA (Suomen Palloliitto)
|style="background:#FFFF00;"|2nd
|style="background:#FFFF00;"|
|-
|style="background:#FFFF00;"|1979
|style="background:#FFFF00;"|Tier 1
|style="background:#FFFF00;"|Mestaruussarja (Premier League)
|style="background:#FFFF00;"|
|style="background:#FFFF00;"|Finnish FA (Suomen Palloliitto)
|style="background:#FFFF00;"|5th
|style="background:#FFFF00;"|
|-
|style="background:#FFFF00;"|1980
|style="background:#FFFF00;"|Tier 1
|style="background:#FFFF00;"|SM-Sarja (Premier League)
|style="background:#FFFF00;"|
|style="background:#FFFF00;"|Finnish FA (Suomen Palloliitto)
|style="background:#FFFF00;"|11th
|style="background:#FFFF00;"|Relegation Group 1st
|-
|style="background:#FFFF00;"|1981
|style="background:#FFFF00;"|Tier 1
|style="background:#FFFF00;"|SM-Sarja (Premier League)
|style="background:#FFFF00;"|
|style="background:#FFFF00;"|Finnish FA (Suomen Palloliitto)
|style="background:#FFFF00;"|1st
|style="background:#FFFF00;"|Championship Group 2nd
|-
|style="background:#FFFF00;"|1982
|style="background:#FFFF00;"|Tier 1
|style="background:#FFFF00;"|SM-Sarja (Premier League)
|style="background:#FFFF00;"|
|style="background:#FFFF00;"|Finnish FA (Suomen Palloliitto)
|style="background:#FFFF00;"|2nd
|style="background:#FFFF00;"|Championship Group 5th
|-
|style="background:#FFFF00;"|1983
|style="background:#FFFF00;"|Tier 1
|style="background:#FFFF00;"|SM-Sarja (Premier League)
|style="background:#FFFF00;"|
|style="background:#FFFF00;"|Finnish FA (Suomen Palloliitto)
|style="background:#FFFF00;"|8th
|style="background:#FFFF00;"|Championship Group 7th
|-
|style="background:#FFFF00;"|1984
|style="background:#FFFF00;"|Tier 1
|style="background:#FFFF00;"|SM-Sarja (Premier League)
|style="background:#FFFF00;"|
|style="background:#FFFF00;"|Finnish FA (Suomen Palloliitto)
|style="background:#FFFF00;"|10th
|style="background:#FFFF00;"|
|-
|style="background:#FFFF00;"|1985
|style="background:#FFFF00;"|Tier 1
|style="background:#FFFF00;"|SM-Sarja (Premier League)
|style="background:#FFFF00;"|
|style="background:#FFFF00;"|Finnish FA (Suomen Palloliitto)
|style="background:#FFFF00;"|11th
|style="background:#FFFF00;"|Relegation Playoff
|-
|style="background:#FFFF00;"|1986
|style="background:#FFFF00;"|Tier 1
|style="background:#FFFF00;"|SM-Sarja (Premier League)
|style="background:#FFFF00;"|
|style="background:#FFFF00;"|Finnish FA (Suomen Palloliitto)
|style="background:#FFFF00;"|9th
|style="background:#FFFF00;"|
|-
|style="background:#FFFF00;"|1987
|style="background:#FFFF00;"|Tier 1
|style="background:#FFFF00;"|SM-Sarja (Premier League)
|style="background:#FFFF00;"|
|style="background:#FFFF00;"|Finnish FA (Suomen Palloliitto)
|style="background:#FFFF00;"|12th
|style="background:#FFFF00;"|Relegated
|-            
|style="background:#87CEFA;"|1988
|style="background:#87CEFA;"|Tier 2
|style="background:#87CEFA;"|I Divisioona (First Division)
|style="background:#87CEFA;"|
|style="background:#87CEFA;"|Finnish FA (Suomen Palloliitto)
|style="background:#87CEFA;"|6th
|style="background:#87CEFA;"|
|-            
|style="background:#87CEFA;"|1989
|style="background:#87CEFA;"|Tier 2
|style="background:#87CEFA;"|I Divisioona (First Division)
|style="background:#87CEFA;"|
|style="background:#87CEFA;"|Finnish FA (Suomen Palloliitto)
|style="background:#87CEFA;"|3rd
|style="background:#87CEFA;"|
|-            
|style="background:#87CEFA;"|1990
|style="background:#87CEFA;"|Tier 2
|style="background:#87CEFA;"|I Divisioona (First Division)
|style="background:#87CEFA;"|
|style="background:#87CEFA;"|Finnish FA (Suomen Palloliitto)
|style="background:#87CEFA;"|''11th|style="background:#87CEFA;"|Relegated
|- 
|style="background:#77DD77;"|1991
|style="background:#77DD77;"|Tier 3
|style="background:#77DD77;"|II Divisioona (Second Division)
|style="background:#77DD77;"|North Group
|style="background:#77DD77;"|Finnish FA (Suomen Palloliitto)
|style="background:#77DD77;"|12th|style="background:#77DD77;"|Relegated - merged with Elo to form FC Kuopio
|}21 seasons in Mestaruussarja29 seasons in I Divisioona7 season in II Divisioona1 season in Aluesarja

HonoursFinnish Championship:Runners-up (2): 1978, 1981Finnish Cup:Runners-up (2):''' 1957, 1978

References

Football clubs in Finland
Kuopio
1931 establishments in Finland
1990 disestablishments in Finland